Fyra Bugg & en Coca Cola, also known as 4 Bugg & en Coca Cola,  is the debut studio album by the Swedish singer Lotta Engberg, released on 13 April 1987 by Mariann Grammofon.

It was rereleased to CD in 1992.

Track listing

Charts

References

External links 

 

1987 debut albums
Lotta Engberg albums